

SAI Ambrosini was an Italian aircraft manufacturer established in Passignano sul Trasimeno, Italy, in 1922 as the Società Aeronautica Italiana. It became SAI Ambrosini when it was acquired by the Ambrosini group in 1934.  Prior to World War II, the firm built a number of light touring and racing aircraft, the most successful of which was the SAI.7.  During the war, this design served as the basis for some light fighter designs, but these did not enter mass production.

Ambrosini was reformed in 1946 and continued with the development and manufacture of the SAI.7 design, eventually producing jet fighter prototypes based on it, but these were not successful. During the 1980s, the firm ventured into boat-building (including Azzurra, Italy's first America's Cup contender) and eventually into oil rigs before closing in 1992.

Aircraft

See also

 List of Italian aircraft companies

References

 
Italian brands
Defunct aircraft manufacturers of Italy
Vehicle manufacturing companies established in 1922
1922 establishments in Italy
Vehicle manufacturing companies disestablished in 1992